This is a list of Buddhist temples, monasteries, stupas, and pagodas in Nepal for which there are Wikipedia articles, sorted by location.

Kapilbastu District
 Tilaurakot, archeological site as the location for the historical site of Kapilavastu

Kathmandu District
 Amitabha Monastery
 Benchen Monastery
 Boudhanath
 Ka-Nying Shedrub Ling
 Kindo Baha, also known as Kirttana Mahavihara (Theravadin)
 Kopan Monastery
 Pranidhipurna Mahavihar (Theravadin)
 Seto Gumba
 Swayambhunath
 Tergar Osel Ling Monastery
 Tharlam Monastery

Lalitpur District
 Hiranya Varna Mahavihar, known locally as the "Golden Temple"

Mustang District
 Chhairo gompa
 Muktinath
 Sambha gompa

Rupandehi District

 Lumbini, birthplace of Gautama Buddha
 Maya Devi Temple, Lumbini

Solukhumbu District
 Pema Namding Monastery
 Phugmoche Monastery
 Tengboche Monastery

See also
 Buddhism in Nepal
 List of Buddhist temples
 List of monasteries in Nepal

Notes

External links

 BuddhaNet's Comprehensive Directory of Buddhist Temples sorted by country
 Buddhactivity Dharma Centres database

 
 
Nepal
Buddhist temples